{{DISPLAYTITLE:C12H24O2}}
The molecular formula C12H24O2 (molar mass: 200.31 g/mol, exact mass: 200.1776 u) may refer to:

 Ethyl decanoate
 Lauric acid
 Hexyl hexanoate
 Propyl myristate